Gandhra is a village in Rohtak district of Haryana, India. According to 2011 Census of India population of the village is 6241.

Gandhra is a village in Rohtak district of Haryana, India. It is 16 km from Rohtak, its district headquarters, km from tehsil Sampla, and 52 km west of Delhi, the capital of India. Nearby villages are Kharawar, Atail, Nonond, Paksma, Gijhhi-Dataur, Chuliana and Ismaila.  In the 2011 Census of India, population of the village was 6241.

This village is inhabited by four main castes viz jat, brahmin, chamar, and dhanak. All these four caste are almost equal in proportion. Teli, doom, jogi, bairagi, lohar, maniyar, lilgar and mali caste also comprise the village population.Baba Garib Nath Temple, bhaiyya, chuganan mai and Lord Shyam Ji Temple are the sacred places.

The literacy rate of the village is about 85%. For health concern there is Govt. PHC as well as the charitable hospital Jain Dhramarth Aushdhyalya.

There are two Govt. Senior Secondary Schools for boys and girls and one private school, Bal Kalyan High School.

Naresh Malik, a former MLA, was born in Gandhra and first to win on a BJP ticket from hasangarh constituency.

References

Villages in Rohtak district